Mesolakkia is a village located in the Pangaion Hills, dating from the 10th century and is located in the southern part of the mountain in the regional unit of Serres. Today it is abandoned, with its inhabitants being shared between Palaiokomi and Nea Mesolakkia.

See also
List of settlements in the Serres regional unit

References

Populated places in Serres (regional unit)